A by-election was held for the Australian House of Representatives seat of Echuca on 10 July 1907. This was triggered after the result at the 1906 election, which saw Anti-Socialist candidate Albert Palmer narrowly defeat Protectionist MP Thomas Kennedy by just 32 votes. This election was declared void by the Court of Disputed Returns.

Palmer was re-elected at the by-election with an increased majority.

Results

References

1907 elections in Australia
Victorian federal by-elections
1900s in Victoria (Australia)